Inks Dam was constructed from 1936 to 1938 and forms Inks Lake, one of the seven Texas Highland Lakes. The lake and dam are owned and operated by the Lower Colorado River Authority for hydropower generation and recreational purposes and are named for Roy B. Inks, one of the original members on the LCRA Board of Directors. 

The Dam is also home to a national fish hatchery. The facility also has an isolation building for endangered species containing aquariums of various sizes of circular tanks.

References

External links

 LCRA Website
 Camp Longhorn Website

buildings and structures in Burnet County, Texas
buildings and structures in Llano County, Texas
dams completed in 1938
dams in Texas
hydroelectric power plants in Texas
Lower Colorado River Authority dams